is a 1974 Japanese drama film directed by Kei Kumai, starring Yoko Takahashi, Komaki Kurihara and Kinuyo Tanaka. It was nominated for the 1975 Academy Award for Best Foreign Language Film. It also became one of the highest-grossing Japanese films at the Chinese box office, where it generated box office admissions in the hundreds of millions.

Plot
A young female journalist Keiko Mitani (Komaki Kurihara) is researching an article on the history of Japanese women who were sex slaves in Asian brothels during the early 20th century. She locates Osaki (Kinuyo Tanaka), an elderly woman who lives with a number of cats in a shack in a remote village. Osaki agrees to tell her life story, and the film goes into flashback to the early 1920s. A young Osaki (Yoko Takashi) is sold by her poverty-stricken family into indentured servitude as a maid in Sandakan, British North Borneo (today’s Sabah, Malaysia) at what she believes to be a hotel. At parting, Osaki's distraught and tragic mother gives her a kimono that she has woven by hand over the night before her daughter's departure. The kimono will be Osaki's most treasured possession forever. The establishment is actually a brothel called Sandakan No. 8. Osaki, who is sold as a young girl, works for two years as a maid, but is forced by the brothel’s owners to become a prostitute. Osaki stays at Sandakan 8 until World War II, and in that period she never experiences genuine affection outside of a brief romance with a poor farmer who abandons her when he comes one evening to the brothel and sees the disheveled and exhausted Osaki after an onslaught of service to a battalion of Japanese sailors recently docked at the town. When Osaki returns to Japan, her brother and his wife, who have bought a house with the money she sent them, tell her that she has become an embarrassment.

Osaki returns to Sandakan. At the end of the war she marries a Japanese man, who then dies. On returning to Japan, because of her experiences at Sandakan No. 8 she is shunned and treated like a pariah, even by her son who lives a respectable life in a large city.

Cast
 Komaki Kurihara – Keiko Mitani
 Yoko Takahashi – Osaki as a young woman
 Kinuyo Tanaka – Osaki Yamakawa, as an old woman
 Takiko Mizunoe – Okiku
 Eiko Mizuhara – Ofumi
 Yoko Todo – Oyae
 Yukiko Yanagawa – Otake
 Yoko Nakagawa – Ohana
 Masayo Umezawa – Yukiyo
 Ken Tanaka – Hideo Takeuchi
 Eitaro Ozawa – Tarozo
 Tomoko Jinbo – Moto
 Hideo Sunazuka – Yajima
 Mitsuo Hamada – Yasukichi
 Kaneko Iwasaki – Sato
 Siti Sundari Samad aka Siti Tanjung Perak – local people
 Omar Hitam aka Udo Omar – local people

Production
Sandakan No. 8 was based on the 1972 book Sandakan Brothel No. 8: An Episode in the History of Lower-Class by Yamazaki Tomoko. The book focused on the "karayuki-san", the Japanese term for young women who were forced into sexual slavery (see sex trafficking) in Pacific Rim countries and colonies during the early 20th century. The book created controversy in Japan, where the subject of the karayuki-san was not discussed in public or in scholarly examinations of Japanese history. Yamazaki’s book was a best-seller and won the Oya Soichi Prize for Non-Fiction Literature; she quickly followed up with a sequel, The Graves of Sandakan. Filmmaker Kei Kumai combined the two books into the screenplay for Sandakan No. 8.

Awards and release
Sandakan No. 8 won Best Picture, Best Director, and Best Actress for Kinuyo Tanaka in the 1975 Kinema Jumpo Awards. Tanaka won the Best Actress Award at the 25th Berlin International Film Festival, while Kumai received a Best Director nomination at that festival.

Sandakan No. 8 was nominated for the 1975 Academy Award for Best Foreign Language Film, but it lost to another production directed by a Japanese filmmaker: Akira Kurosawa's Dersu Uzala, which was the Soviet Union entry for the Oscar competition.

The film was not released in the U.S. until late 1976. Roger Ebert, in a review published in the Chicago Sun-Times, noted the film’s "material is sensitively handled...the movie is not explicit."  But Janet Maslin, in a review for The New York Times, called it a "film about prostitution, narrated from what is supposed to be a feminist point of view. However feminism, in this case, only means interjecting a particularly noxious form of man-hating where the pornographic touches ordinarily might be." To date, Sandakan No. 8 has not been commercially released in the U.S. on DVD.

Reception 
The Japanese filmmaker Akira Kurosawa cited Sandakan No. 8 as one of his 100 favorite films.

Box office
The film was an overseas blockbuster in China, where it released as 望乡 (Wàng Xiāng) in 1978. It was among the first foreign films released there after the Cultural Revolution ended. It was one of the highest-grossing Japanese films at the Chinese box office at the time, along with Kimi yo Fundo no Kawa o Watare (Manhunt). Chinese audiences related to the topic of comfort women (which occurred during the Japanese occupation of China) and it was among the earliest depictions of sexuality seen in Chinese cinemas. The film generated total Chinese box office admissions in the hundreds of millions.

See also
 Comfort women
 Japanese migration to Malaysia
 Sandakan Japanese Cemetery
 Japanese occupation of British Borneo
 List of submissions to the 48th Academy Awards for Best Foreign Language Film
 List of Japanese submissions for the Academy Award for Best Foreign Language Film

References

External links
 

1974 films
1974 drama films
Best Film Kinema Junpo Award winners
Films directed by Kei Kumai
1970s Japanese-language films
Sandakan
Toho films
Films scored by Akira Ifukube
Japanese drama films
1970s Japanese films